Zhao Jingshen (April 25, 1902 – January 7, 1985) was a popular Chinese novelist. Born in Lishui, Zhejiang, he was a member of the Seminar in literature. He also contributed to the field of translation and folk opera, and funded other writers.

1902 births
1985 deaths
Translators to Chinese
Writers from Lishui
People's Republic of China translators
Academic staff of Fudan University
Educators from Lishui
20th-century Chinese translators
Chinese male novelists
Scholars of Chinese opera